Lyme Regis Cemetery is the principal cemetery in the English town of Lyme Regis, Dorset. Estimates for the number of burials in the cemetery range from 3,570 to over 5,000, nearly half of which may today be unmarked. It was opened on 16 November 1856 as a replacement for the graveyard surrounding St Michael the Archangel – Lyme Regis' parish church – which had long suffered from erosion due to its close proximity to the sea.

History 
Initially, the principal place of burial was at the cemetery surrounding St Michael the Archangel, Lyme Regis' parish church. However, due to its close proximity to the sea, the cemetery had started to erode away, losing many burials to the sea. Because of this, in the 1850s it was decided that a new cemetery would be constructed by Charmouth Road. A conveyance with the landowner was arranged in February 1856, and the ground was consecrated by the Bishop of Salisbury that same year, with the first burial occurring on 16 November. Soon after, two chapels were constructed, one for Church of England services and another for Dissenters (Nonconformists); only the Church of England chapel is still open for services today. The original plan was revised in 1870 to allow for more burials. Shrubs and trees were also planted. Another expansion was required to the west side, which was consecrated by the Bishop of Sherborne in 1935. In 2020, the council closed the entrances via King's Way and Elizabeth Close in order to stop the cemetery being used as a public thoroughfare.

Notable burials 
The cemetery allows anyone regardless of connection to Lyme Regis to be buried, however non-residents pay higher fees. Notable burials include:
Elizabeth Philpot, fossil collector, known for her collaborations with Mary Anning
Georgina Castle Smith, children's writer

The cemetery also contains the war graves of 17 Commonwealth service personnel, 10 of which are from World War I and 7 from World War II.

References

External links 
 

Cemeteries in Dorset
1856 establishments in England